Sinensetin is a methylated flavone. It can be found in Orthosiphon stamineus and in orange oil.

References 

O-methylated flavones